The Trift Bridge is a pedestrian-only suspension bridge in the Swiss Alps.

The Trift Bridge spans the lake, Triftsee, near Gadmen, Switzerland, an area that receives approximately 20,000 visitors per year to see the Trift Glacier. An earlier bridge was built in 2004, as the glacier was no longer high enough to take visitors to the Trift Hut of the Swiss Alpine Club. A replacement bridge was opened on 12 June 2009. It is one of the longest and highest pedestrian bridges in the Alps. The old bridge stands today in the canton of Uri with the name Salbitbrücke.

Reaching the bridge requires taking a cable car in Meiringen, followed by a gondola. Finally, a difficult 1.5 hour uphill hike leads to the bridge.

References

External links

Official Site
Up to the Trift Bridge

Pedestrian bridges in Switzerland